Carl Hoffmann (9 June 1885, in Neisse – 13 July 1947) was a German cinematographer and film director.

Selected filmography

Cinematographer

 The Vice (1915)
 Dr. Hart's Diary (1917)
 Wedding in the Eccentric Club (1917)
 The Plague of Florence (1919)
 Der Herr der Liebe (1919)
 The Woman with Orchids (1919)
 Madness (1919)
 Prince Cuckoo (1919)
 The Head of Janus (1920)
 Patience (1920)
 Figures of the Night (1920)
 Kurfürstendamm (1920)
 Der Graf von Cagliostro (1920)
 The Eyes of the World (1920)
 Lady Hamilton (1921)
 The Lord of the Beasts (1921)
 The House on the Moon (1921)
 The Conspiracy in Genoa (1921)
 Country Roads and the Big City (1921)
 The Flight into Death (1921)
 Dr. Mabuse: The Gambler (1922)
 A Dying Nation (1922)
 Money in the Streets (1922)
 Madame de La Pommeraye's Intrigues (1922)
 The Stone Rider (1923)
 Siegfried (1924)
 The Other Woman (1924)
 Die Nibelungen (1924)
 Varieté (1925)
 Express Train of Love (1925)
 The Woman Who Did (1925)
 Faust (1926)
 A Sister of Six (1926)
 The Bordellos of Algiers (1927)
 Eva and the Grasshopper (1927)
 Ungarische Rhapsodie (1928)
 Hungarian Rhapsody (1928)
 The Mysterious Mirror (1928)
 Looping the Loop (1928)
 High Treason (1929)
 The Wonderful Lies of Nina Petrovna (1929)
 The Tiger Murder Case (1930)
 The Immortal Vagabond (1930)
 A Student's Song of Heidelberg (1930)
 Hocuspocus (1930)
 The Temporary Widow (1930)
 The Flute Concert of Sanssouci (1930)
 Yorck (1931)
 The Wrong Husband (1931)
 In the Employ of the Secret Service (1931)
 The Girl and the Boy (1931)
 Two Hearts Beat as One (1932)
 Man Without a Name (1932)
 Congress Dances (1932)
 How Shall I Tell My Husband? (1932)
 Narcotics (1932)
 Marschall Vorwärts (1932)
 The White Demon (1932)
 Season in Cairo (1933)
 Inge and the Millions (1933)
 Waltz War (1933)
 Court Waltzes (1933)
 The Tunnel (1933)
 The Tunnel (1933, French version)
 Peer Gynt (1934)
 The Csardas Princess (1934)
 Gold in New Frisco (1939)
 The Leghorn Hat (1939)
 Liberated Hands (1939)
 The Girl from Barnhelm (1940)
 The Girl from Fano (1941)
 Via Mala (1945)

Director
 The Mysterious Mirror (1928)
 Victoria (1935)
 After Midnight (1938)

Bibliography
 Eisner, Lotte H. The Haunted Screen: Expressionism in the German Cinema and the Influence of Max Reinhardt. University of California Press, 2008.

External links

1885 births
1947 deaths
People from Nysa, Poland
People from the Province of Silesia
German cinematographers
German film directors